An ATRAC CD is an optical disc containing compressed digital audio in the ATRAC3 or ATRAC3plus formats, which are part of Sony's ATRAC (Adaptive Transform Acoustic Coding) family of proprietary audio compression algorithms.

Description 
ATRAC CD was used with SonicStage Simple Burner software (Ver.1.0 / 1.1) in February 2003, and was subsequently replaced with SonicStage in 2004. The new CD Walkman product was called "ATRAC CD Walkman". In the following year (2004-2005), ATRAC CD boombox was introduced as a new product.

*1 "ATRAC" here refers to the SP mode used in the MD format.

Software for burning ATRAC CD 
The ATRAC CD can be burned with SonicStage Simple Burner Ver.1.1, SonicStage 2.x to 3.x and SonicStage CP. This software is able to create a disk image from MP3 files and compact discs, and can be burned with the included CD-R/RW drive on a computer.

See also 
Walkman
SonicStage
ATRAC
OpenMG
Hi-MD

References

External links 
ATRAC
SONY CD Walkman

Sony products
Compact disc
Digital audio